Peaches in Syrup (Spanish: Melocotón en almíbar) is a 1960 Spanish film directed by Antonio del Amo.

Cast
In alphabetical order
Barta Barri as Duke
Antonio Gandía as baby
José Guardiola as Duke
Manuel Insúa as baby
Carlos Larrañaga as Carlos
Marga López as Sister María
María Mahor as Nuria
Matilde Muñoz Sampedro as Doña Pilar
Pilar Gómez Ferrer as fruit vendor

See also
You Don't Shoot at Angels (1960)

References

External links

Spanish crime comedy films
Films directed by Antonio del Amo
Spanish films based on plays
Films about Catholic nuns
Films scored by Augusto Algueró
1960s Spanish films